Castrol India Limited is an automotive and industrial lubricant manufacturing company. Castrol India is the 2nd largest manufacturer of automotive and industrial lubricants in the Indian lubricant market and owns around 20% market share in the overall Indian lubricant market. It is part of Castrol Limited UK (part of BP Group). It has 5 manufacturing plants that are networked with 270 distributors, serving over 70,000 retail outlets.

History
In 1910, Castrol India started importing certain automotive lubricants from C C Wakefield & Company made an entry in the Indian market. In 1979, CIL was incorporated under the name of Indrol Lubricants and Specialities Pvt Ltd. It was listed on BSE in 1982 and CIL was converted into a public limited company. CIL had formed a subsidiary Company in the year 1987 under the name of Indtech Speciality Chemicals, Ltd.

On 1 November 1990, the name of the company was changed from Indrol Lubricants & Specialities Ltd. to Castrol India Ltd. It helped to manufacture of Telephone cable jellies, pharmaceuticals jellies and industrial waxes in technical collaboration with Dussek Campbell, U.K.

As of December 2019, there were talks ongoing between Reliance Industries and BP for setting up fuel stations in India where Castrol’s products will be sold.

Products
Corrosion preventives, industrial lubricants, metalworking fluids, high temperature grease,cutting oil, automotive oil, neat cutting oil, cleaners

Oils - Cylinder oils-crosshead, crankcase oils-crosshead, truck piston engine oils, hydraulic oils, gear oils, compressor oils, turbine oils, refrigeration oils, emulsifiable oils, multi-grades, heat transfer oils, greases, and fishing

References

External links
 
 Castrol India to double volumes this fiscal

Manufacturing companies based in Mumbai
Energy companies established in 1910
Oil and gas companies of India
Chemical companies of India
Indian companies established in 1910
Chemical companies established in 1910
Companies listed on the National Stock Exchange of India
Companies listed on the Bombay Stock Exchange
Indian companies established in 1979